Richard Gonzalez (born February 3, 1966) is an American professional stock car racing driver who competed in one NASCAR Craftsman Truck Series race in 2004 and a number of ARCA Re/Max Series races from 2004 to 2007. He became the first Hispanic-American driver to compete in ARCA.

Racing career

Early career and Truck Series
Gonzalez began getting interested in racing when he watched a race at Flemington Speedway that his father's friend was competing in. Gonzalez started racing motorcross bikes and then moved up the racing ladder, where he next would race go-karts, microstocks, and legends cars. He then competed in the American Race Trucks Series and the now-defunct NASCAR Goody's Dash Series. In order to have enough money to move up the ranks, Gonzalez had to sell his old equipment from the previous series he raced in as well as his own personal motorcycle.

Gonzalez reached the Craftsman Truck Series in 2004 and would attempt two races for Troxell Racing in a partnership with Rick Ware Racing. Driving their No. 93 Dodge, he failed to qualify in his first attempt at Martinsville. In the next race at Mansfield, which was his other start, he did qualify for the race and finished 26th, nine laps down. 

Gonzalez's next race of the year was scheduled to be in the Busch Series' race at IRP, the Kroger 200, in August. It would have been his debut in that series. He was to drive for a team called Coqui Motorsports. This planned start did not happen, and Gonzalez would never get to make a start in the Busch Series. Also, Coqui was a new team that had never made any Busch starts before, and never would get to after this deal fell through. Gonzalez would not make another start in the Truck Series either, and the rest of his stock car starts came in the ARCA Re/Max Series.

ARCA
He made his ARCA debut at Chicago in Wayne Peterson Racing's No. 06 Chevrolet, and would make one other start in that car in the next race at Salem. He crashed out of both races and would finish 27th and 26th, respectively. With these starts, Gonzalez became the first Hispanic American to start an ARCA race. In 2005, Gonzalez would run full-time and for rookie of the year with the Peterson team split between their various entries (No. 6, No. 16 and No. 06). He was not eligible to run at Daytona, so his first start of the year came in the second race of the season at Nashville, which he did not qualify for along with a staggering twelve other races. The Peterson team was underfunded and had to start and park in a large number of Gonzalez's starts. In the race at Pocono which Gonzalez was going to run the full race in, he was running in the top 10 until he suffered a broken transmission and radiator and did not finish the race. For the final two races of the season, Gonzalez fielded his own team instead. Although he had his own car and equipment, he still used Peterson's car numbers (No. 06 at Salem and No. 16 at Talladega) and owner points. Gonzalez's team partnered with Lafferty Motorsports to field his Talladega entry.

Gonzalez would not make any NASCAR or ARCA starts in 2006, but did return in 2007 in ARCA, when he attempted three races. He first returned to the Peterson team, with a DNQ in the No. 0 at Nashville. The first race in which he did qualify for was at the Milwaukee Mile, where the team got to run the full race in Darrell Basham's No. 94 car thanks to support from Richardson-Netzloff-Harmon Racing (co-owned by driver Mike Harmon, who at the time was competing in ARCA full-time). Although Gonzalez finished eight laps down, he picked up a solid 18th-place finish. He returned to the same car the following race at Gateway, which was without RNH support. Gonzalez failed to qualify the No. 94, but was given a chance to return to the Peterson No. 0 again when team owner-driver Wayne Peterson stepped out of the start and park ride for Gonzalez, who would do the same. This would end up being Gonzalez's last ARCA start.

Personal life
Gonzalez is of Puerto Rican descent and was a member of NASCAR's Diversity Council when he was competing in the sport. After being born in Aguada, Puerto Rico, he moved to South Plainfield, New Jersey. In his Truck Series debut in 2004 at Martinsville, Gonzalez was sponsored by two local businesses, one of which was located in his hometown of South Plainfield and the other one was in Manville, New Jersey. When he ran full-time in ARCA in 2005, he moved from New Jersey to Mooresville, North Carolina (near where most NASCAR teams are based) with the hopes of getting a ride in the NASCAR Busch or Truck Series again, which did not end up happening.

Motorsports career results

NASCAR
(key) (Bold – Pole position awarded by qualifying time. Italics – Pole position earned by points standings or practice time. * – Most laps led.)

Craftsman Truck Series

ARCA Re/Max Series
(key) (Bold – Pole position awarded by qualifying time. Italics – Pole position earned by points standings or practice time. * – Most laps led.)

References

External links
 

Living people
1966 births
People from South Plainfield, New Jersey
Sportspeople from Middlesex County, New Jersey
Racing drivers from New Jersey
NASCAR drivers
American sportspeople of Puerto Rican descent
ARCA Menards Series drivers